The Costa de Almería ("Coast of Almería") is a coastal region of Spain consisting of the coastal municipalities of the province of Almería, in the autonomous community of Andalusia, Spain. The region extends  and includes 13 municipalities, from Pulpí on the border with the province of Murcia to Adra on the border with the province of Granada.

Tourism
The name Costa de Almería is a term established for purposes of promoting tourism within the region. Beginning on 16 February 1928, tourism promoter Rodolfo Lussnigg began promoting the area under the name Costa del Sol; however, that name, originally referring specifically to the city of Almería, has since become attached to the coast of the province of Málaga.

Among the tourist destinations on the Costa de Almería are Vera, Mojácar, Roquetas de Mar and Almerimar, and such natural areas as the Cabo de Gata-Níjar Natural Park, the Punta Entinas-Sabinar Nature Reserve, and the Isla de San Andrés.

History

Almería has been home to different civilisations throughout its history. Significant traces of their presence can be seen in the archaeological remains scattered all over the province.

There is evidence of a very special prehistoric culture in Los Millares and el Argar. Phoenicians, Carthaginians and Greeks exploited its mines and traded up and down its coast. The Romans, who settled here in the 3rd century B.C., transformed it into "Porto Magnus" on the Mediterranean and dominated the area until the later arrival of the Visigoths in the 7th century. The Arabs created the current capital in the 10th century, and from here they ruled over one of the most important taifas (kingdoms) in Muslim Spain. The Arab influence was the most significant, as they remained in Spain for almost eight centuries. There are several monuments which bear witness to the fertile history of this land. The castles and fortresses provide an exceptional historic testimony for understanding the societies of the past.

Long exposed to border conflicts and the need to defend itself, the province of Almería has a large number and variety of castles which comprise a heritage known to few. The mining industry brought about an economic recovery in the 19th century.

Landscape

The Sierra María-Los Vélez Nature Reserves with their castle, their caves and their rich fauna, and the Cabo de Gata-Níjar Natural Park, with its deserted beaches, wild cliffs and transparent sea beds, bring alive a landscape which offers the traveller the magic of snow, the Mediterranean forest, the desert and the sea.

Coastal municipalities and comarcas
The municipalities that make up the Costa de Almería fall into three comarcas: 
 Levante Almeriense is in the eastern part of the province, adjacent to the province of Murcia, and includes the coastal municipalities of Carboneras, Mojácar, Garrucha, Vera, Cuevas del Almanzora, and Pulpí. 
 The Metropolitan Comarca of Almería around the Bay of Almería includes the provincial capital Almería and the municipality of Níjar, which includes most of the Cabo de Gata-Níjar Natural Park.
Poniente Almeriense is in the southwest of the province, adjacent to the province of  Granada, and includes the coastal municipalities of  Adra, Berja, El Ejido (including Almerimar), Roquetas de Mar, and Enix.

List of beaches

Poniente Almeriense

Bahía de Almería

Levante Almeriense

Notes

External links 

 Official tourism site of Almería (in Spanish with Google translation option)

Almeria
Geography of the Province of Almería
Tourism in Spain